Laklakyurt (Laqlaq-yurt) is a rural locality (a selo) in Kosteksky Selsoviet, Khasavyurtovsky District, Republic of Dagestan, Russia. The population was 177 as of 2010. There are 3 streets.

Geography 
Laklakyurt is located 29 km northeast of Khasavyurt (the district's administrative centre) by road. Novy Kostek is the nearest rural locality.

References 

Rural localities in Khasavyurtovsky District